Thomas Carey MacMillan (born 21 June 1948) was the longest serving President and CEO of CIBC Mellon, and a Canadian businessman.

Family

Thomas MacMillan was born to Dr Robert MacMillan and Eluned Carey Evans in Toronto.  His maternal grandmother, Olwen Elizabeth Lloyd George, was a daughter of David Lloyd George, British Prime Minister between 1916 and 1922, with his first wife Margaret Owen.  He is the third of five children, and the eldest son.

His eldest sister, Margaret Olwen MacMillan, is the Warden of St. Antony's College, Oxford.  His elder sister, Ann MacMillan, is Manager of the London Bureau of the CBC.

Career

Thomas MacMillan became President and CEO of CIBC Mellon in 1998, prior to assuming this role he was Chairman, President and CEO of Mellon Bank Canada.  He also held positions of responsibility at Montreal Trust where he served as Executive Vice-President of Corporate Services, and at Chase Manhattan Bank of Canada where he held the positions of Vice-President, Corporate Banking and subsequently President and CEO.

On October 15, 2009, CIBC Mellon announced that Thomas S. Monahan would be succeeding MacMillan as President and CEO, and that MacMillan would become Chairman.  Following his appointment as Chairman of CIBC Mellon MacMillan was also appointed Canadian Regional Director for BNY Mellon.  In February 2012, MacMillan became the Chairman of Blair Franklin Asset Management.

Directorships
Thomas MacMillan serves on, or has served on, the following Boards of Directors:
 Branksome Hall School
 Canadian Capital Markets Association
 Canada Colors and Chemicals Ltd.
 The Corporation of Massey Hall & Roy Thomson Hall
 Tafelmusik Baroque Orchestra
 The Guarantee Company of North America
 Fairwater Capital Corporation
 North Toronto Hockey Association
 Ontario Centre for Environmental Technical Advancement
 Sonor Investments Limited
 Toronto Symphony Orchestra
 University Health Network

Education

After graduating from the University of Toronto Schools, Thomas MacMillan received his Bachelor's degree from Princeton University and a Master's degree from the London School of Economics and Political Science (LSE).

See also
 CIBC Mellon

References

External links
 Blair Franklin
 Blair Franklin Biography

Living people
Canadian bank presidents
Canadian chief executives
Princeton University alumni
Alumni of the London School of Economics
1948 births
Canadian Imperial Bank of Commerce people
Canadian chairpersons of corporations
Canadian corporate directors